Touch of Evil is a 1958 American film noir written and directed by Orson Welles, who also stars in the film. The screenplay was loosely based on the contemporary Whit Masterson novel Badge of Evil (1956). The cast included Charlton Heston, Janet Leigh, Joseph Calleia, Akim Tamiroff and Marlene Dietrich.

Universal-International commissioned the film adaptation of the novel in April 1956. Albert Zugsmith was selected as producer, who then hired television writer Paul Monash to write the script. Charlton Heston was brought onboard to star in January 1957 and suggested that Orson Welles direct the project. Welles was hired to direct and star, as well as re-write the script. Filming started the next month and wrapped in April. During the film's post-production, creative differences between Welles and Universal executives arose and Welles was forced off the film. Subsequently, Universal-International revised the film's editing style to be more conventional and ordered re-shoots to be made in November 1957. In response to the new version, Welles wrote a 58-page memo in which he elaborately outlined his creative vision for the film and asked that his version be restored.

Initially dismissed by film critics, Touch of Evil found popularity among European audiences and won top awards at the 1958 Brussels World Film Festival. During the 1970s, its reputation was renewed and it is now widely regarded as one of Welles's best motion pictures and one of the best classic-era noir films. Touch of Evil was re-edited according to Welles's original vision, as outlined in his memo, in 1998.

In 1993, the film was selected for preservation in the United States National Film Registry by the Library of Congress as being "culturally, historically, or aesthetically significant".

Plot 

Along the U.S.–Mexico border, a time bomb placed inside a vehicle explodes, killing Rudy Linnekar and his stripper girlfriend Zita. On his honeymoon with his American wife Susie, Mexican special prosecutor Miguel Vargas takes an interest in the investigation. Local authorities arrive on the scene, followed by 30-year police captain Hank Quinlan and his longtime assistant, Pete Menzies. Quinlan and Menzies implicate Sanchez, a young Mexican secretly married to the victim's daughter, Marcia, as the prime suspect. During the interrogation at Sanchez's apartment, Menzies locates two sticks of dynamite in the same shoebox that Vargas had found empty only a few minutes earlier. Vargas accuses Quinlan of planting evidence, and begins to suspect that he may have been doing so for years to help win convictions. Quinlan dismisses Vargas's claim, saying he is just biased in favor of fellow Mexicans.

The stress of these accusations, along with pressure from "Uncle" Joe Grandi, the brother of a man Vargas has been investigating, to strike a deal to discredit Vargas, causes Quinlan—who has been sober for 12 years—to relapse. With assistance from the District Attorney's Assistant Al Schwartz, Vargas studies the public records on Quinlan's cases, revealing his findings to Gould and Adair. Quinlan arrives in time to overhear the discussion and angrily threatens to resign.

Meanwhile, Vargas sends his wife to a remote motel to remove her from the Grandis' unwanted attention. Unknown to him, the hotel is owned by Grandi. Grandi's family members terrorize Susie. Vargas becomes concerned when his attempts to telephone his wife at the motel are blocked. Per their agreement, Grandi arranges for Susie to appear unconscious from a drug overdose in a downtown motel, set up for Quinlan to "discover" her. Instead, Quinlan strangles Grandi there and leaves his corpse with Susie. When she wakes up, she screams for help but instead is arrested on suspicion of murder.

Vargas confronts Menzies about Quinlan's history of "discovering" incriminating evidence in his cases. He goes to Susie's motel but cannot find her, discovering both that the motel is owned by Grandi and that his handgun has been stolen. He rushes back to town and enters a bar, where he confronts the gang members who attacked his wife. When they refuse to answer his questions, Vargas attacks them but is overwhelmed.

Schwartz informs Vargas that Susie has been arrested for murder. At the lockup, Menzies reveals to Vargas that he discovered Quinlan's cane at the murder scene, implicating him. Menzies agrees to wear a wire for Vargas. Quinlan is at ex-lover Tana's brothel across the border. A loud player piano prevents recording, so Menzies lures Quinlan out. While they walk Vargas trails them, recording their conversation.

Quinlan confesses to Menzies that he planted evidence on suspects, but just the "guilty" ones. Quinlan hears an echo from Vargas' tracking device and suspects Menzies of betrayal. Quinlan demands that Vargas show himself and then shoots Menzies. Just as Quinlan is prepared to shoot the unarmed Vargas, claiming he'll plead self-defense, Menzies shoots Quinlan, then expires. Schwartz arrives at the scene and tells Vargas that Sanchez had confessed to the crime, vindicating Quinlan. Vargas is reunited with Susie. Tana arrives and rues Quinlan's death.

Cast

Production

Development 
In March 1956, the mystery novel Badge of Evil was released to generally favorable reviews and its sales were brisk, with two printings in hardcover. Edward Muhl, the head of production of Universal-International, believed the novel had cinematic possibilities and arranged to purchase the film rights through the literary agency Curtis Brown. By April 1956, the Los Angeles Times reported that the film rights had been acquired and that Albert Zugsmith (known as the "King of the Bs") had been tapped as producer. Zugsmith then assigned television writer Paul Monash to write the script adaptation within four weeks. Zugsmith then read Monash's script, but did not care for it and temporarily halted any further development on the project. By December 1956, Zugsmith had received a memo from Universal executive Mel Tucker inquiring about the development of Badge of Evil and suggested the possibility of casting Charlton Heston as the lead.

By January 1957, having just finished promoting The Ten Commandments (1956), Heston had received the script and considered it good enough. The actor contacted Universal to ask who they had considered to direct. They told him that they did not know, but Orson Welles was lined up as Hank Quinlan. Heston then replied, "Why not him direct, too. He's pretty good" to which the studio responded "We'll get back to you." Universal studio head executives Ernest Nims and Jim Pratt—both of whom had worked with Welles on The Stranger (1946)—lobbied for Welles to direct again. Based on Pratt's suggestion, Universal-International offered Welles $125,000 for the job to act, direct, and based on his choosing, to rewrite the script. On January 11, it was officially announced that Welles had signed with Muhl to star in and direct Badge of Evil.

Welles had previously starred in Man in the Shadow (1957). According to Zugsmith, on the last day of shooting, Welles, who was impressed with Zugsmith's writing abilities, expressed that he was interested in directing a picture for him. Zugsmith offered Welles a pile of scripts, of which he requested the worst one. Welles was then handed Monash's script for Badge of Evil to which he asked, "Can I have two weeks to write it?" Zugsmith replied, "You can have it."

Writing 

For his screenplay draft, Welles made numerous changes along with smaller changes to better tighten the script. His two main contributions dealt with his thematic element of American racism and his decision to shift narrative point of views. He shifted the location setting from San Diego to the Mexico–United States border. Welles renamed the protagonist from Mitch Holt to Miguel Vargas, stating he made the character a Mexican "for political reasons. I wanted to show how Tijuana and the border towns are corrupted by all sorts of mish-mash, publicity more or less about American relations". Welles's shooting script was finished by February 5, 1958. Heston stated that Welles re-wrote the script in ten days.

Casting 
Welles selected Janet Leigh for the role of Susan Vargas. Before her agent had notified her of the casting, Welles contacted Leigh via telegram stating how delighted he was to work with her on Badge of Evil. She contacted her agent, and accepted the part. Dennis Weaver was asked to audition as the night manager after Welles had watched him as Chester Goode on Gunsmoke. He was instructed to improvise. Meanwhile, Zugsmith had met Joanna Cook Moore at a party, and was determined that she was right for the role as Marcia Linnekar. Welles rounded out the supporting cast with Akim Tamiroff, whom he previously cast in Mr. Arkadin (1955), while Joseph Cotten, Ray Collins, Marlene Dietrich, and Keenan Wynn agreed to appear in the film for union pay scale and without screen credit. Zugsmith also insisted that his friend Zsa Zsa Gabor be given a cameo in the film. Ultimately, all actors were paid over union scale and given screen credit.

Having known Mercedes McCambridge since her time at Mercury Theatre, Welles called her and requested she arrive at the set. Leigh and the actors dressed as "greasy-looking hoodlums" stood around waiting for Welles to start filming. Welles had McCambridge's hair cut and applied black shoe polish over her newly trim hair and eyebrows. According to her memoir: "They brought a black leather jacket from somewhere, and I was 'ready.' Orson said he wanted a heavy, coarse Mexican accent. I said, 'You've got it!'"

Filming 
The film was shot in Venice, California from February 18, 1957 to April 2, 1957. The location had been suggested by Aldous Huxley to Welles, who informed him the town had decayed significantly. Welles, cinematographer Russell Metty, and the art directors drove there, and upon viewing the city's Bridge of Sighs, Welles decided to revise the ending to incorporate it.

As when he worked with cinematographer Gregg Toland, Welles and Metty devised a distinctive visual style for Touch of Evilincorporating deep focus, off-kilter and low-angle shots (to emphasize the girth of Quinlan), and other stylistic touches that furthered the visual style of film noir. Most notable among the stylistic flourishes in the film is an opening crane shot that runs almost three-and-a-half minutes, which has frequently been commented on by film scholars.

Post-production 
As was typical, Welles himself worked on the film's editing, paired initially with Edward Curtiss. According to Zugsmith, the two had creative differences, and Curtiss was replaced with Virgil Vogel. During June 1957, Welles flew out to New York to appear on The Steve Allen Show. In his absence, studio executives had scheduled a screening of the rough cut. Informed of this by Vogel, Welles was angered, resulting in Universal post-production head Ernest Nims cancelling the screening. At this point, Vogel agreed to step down, and Nims appointed Aaron Stell, another Universal staff editor, to finish the film. When Welles returned to Hollywood, Nims instructed him to stay out of the editing room and let Stell work alone. Having been locked out, Welles went to Mexico City in late June 1957 to begin shooting his next film, Don Quixote.

On his own, Stell constantly changed the editing sequence, providing different interpretations of multiple scenes in which he altered the continuity. Throughout the editing process, Stell was never satisfied, and at the end of his tenure, he stated he had grown "ill, depressed and unhappy with the studio's impatience." In July 1957, Stell's cut was screened to the executives, most of whom were left unimpressed. According to Nims, Welles "had really messed up those first five reels...He was making those quick cuts—in the middle of a scene you cut to another scene, and then come back and finish the scene, and then cut to the last half of the other scene."

Hoping to make the continuity editing more conventional, Muhl appointed Nims to re-edit the film. A month later, Nims's cut was shown to Welles, who remained diplomatic but was astonished at the newly altered cut. Welles wrote a memorandum as a critique to Nim's revisions, and shortly after, he left for Louisiana to appear in Martin Ritt's The Long, Hot Summer (1958). By November 1957, Universal removed about fifteen minutes from the film, and hired Harry Keller to film some expository scenes intended to make the plot easier to follow.

Out of loyalty to Welles, Heston and Leigh initially refused to film the re-shoots. A week later, Heston's agents informed him that he was contractually obligated to film re-shoots if necessary. For the re-shoots, Clifford Stine had replaced Metty as the film's cinematographer while new dialogue had been written by Franklin Coen, a staff scriptwriter for Universal. Several new scenes were filmed including four scenes between Vargas and his wife, a love scene in the car, and a scene where Menzies explains about Quinlan's leg. Another scene was shot in which Quinlan's car meets Vargas's en route to the motel, in which an uncredited actor doubles for Welles. On November 19, re-shoots under Keller were completed. Heston further reflected in his journal: "I have done worse work in the movies than this day's retakes, but I don't remember feeling worse...I was able to talk them out of one change I felt was a mistake."

On December 5, 1957, having been screened a new cut, Welles presented a 58-page memorandum addressed to Muhl, detailing what he thought needed to be done to make the film work. In response, Muhl stated his changes would be implemented, but also requested that Welles attend a dubbing session. Welles refused.

Initial release and reception 
On January 31, 1958, Touch of Evil was given a sneak preview at a theater in Pacific Palisades, Los Angeles. This version of the film ran 108 minutes, and was not well-received. Heston wrote in his journal that "I'm afraid it's simply not a good picture. It has the brilliance that made each day's rushes look so exciting, of course. Indeed, there's hardly a dull shot in the film. But it doesn't hold together as a story." In February 1958, Touch of Evil was attached in a double bill with The Female Animal, starring Hedy Lamarr, which was also produced by Albert Zugsmith and directed by Harry Keller. The two films even had the same cameraman, Russell Metty. This general version ran only 94 minutes.

Contemporary reviews 
Howard Thompson of The New York Times wrote "...while good versus evil remains the text, the lasting impression of this film is effect rather than substance, hence its real worth." He complimented the film's direction noting that "Mr. Welles' is an obvious but brilliant bag of tricks. Using a superlative camera (manned by Russell Metty) like a black-snake whip, he lashes the action right into the spectator's eye." Philip K. Scheuer of the Los Angeles Times wrote "As usual, Welles has placed mood above content. But what mood! Touch of Evil is underkeyed, underlighted and undermonitored (for sound), but with the assistance of Russell Metty's marvelous mobile camera it charges ahead like the pure cinema it so often succeeds in being, complete with built-in stocks." Harrison's Reports felt that Welles "has peopled the story with odd characterizations and, in an apparent effort to get away from routine picture-making, has made dramatic use of unusual photographic angles, shadows and lighting. This makes for an arty approach but it seems to lessen the dramatic impact of the story. The acting is very good, and a number of the individual scenes are tense and exciting."

Variety felt that "Welles establishes his creative talent with pomp, but unfortunately the circumstances of the story suffer. There is insufficient orientation and far too little exposition, with the result that much of the action is confusing and difficult to relate to the plot...Welles' script contains some hard-hitting dialogue; his use of low-key lighting with Russell is effective, and Russell Metty's photography is fluid and impressive; and Henry Mancini's music is poignant. But Touch of Evil proves it takes more than good scenes to make a good picture." Dorothy Masters, reviewing for the New York Daily News, gave the film three stars out of four noting that the "Welles touch is manifest in a taunt screen play, suspenseful presentation, stark backgrounds, off-beat camera angles and a weird assortment of characters. The production is advantage and are ably supported by the rest of the cast."

Accolades 
Although Universal Pictures did its best to prevent Touch of Evil from being selected for the 1958 Brussels World Film Festival—part of the Expo 58 world's fair—the film received its European premiere and Welles was invited to attend. To his astonishment, Welles collected the two top awards. Touch of Evil would also receive the International Critics Prize, and Welles was recognized for his body of work.

Critical re-evaluation 
In 1998, Roger Ebert added Touch of Evil to his Great Movies list. He praised the lead and supporting actors and argued that the cinematography was "not simply showing off" but rather was used to add depth to the complex plot by showing interpersonal connections and "trapping [the characters] in the same shots". Ebert also speculated Welles's role was semi-autobiographical, describing his Quinlan character as nursing old feuds and demonstrating an obsessive desire for control that arguably parallels Welles's life and career. Todd McCarthy of Variety stated that although the restored film was virtually the same, he noted the film's plot is more coherent and that "due to the pristine new print, Welles' technical virtuosity and ingenious use of locations have never been more evident, and the entire picture plays more smoothly." Peter Stack of the San Francisco Gate wrote "Touch of Evil is a savvy starter because Welles' astonishing cinematic invention and his persuasive presence as star are prime noir attractions. The look, a deftly arranged climate of odd shadows and angles, neon lighting and flawlessly choreographed action scenes, keeps interest piqued through a contrived plot and mannered acting."

Michael Wilmington of the Chicago Tribune positively wrote the film was "close to the pinnacle of film noir" thanks to "[w]izardly moving camera shots, nightmarish angles and incredibly florid, amusing performances". Kenneth Turan, reviewing for the Los Angeles Times, summarized the 1998 re-cut: "Photographed by Russell Metty, Touch of Evil is one of the standard-bearers for the kind of eye-catching, bravura camera work Welles favored. Expressionistic in the extreme, filled with shadows, angles and cinematic flourishes, the film raises the usual brooding nightmare ambience of film noir to a level few other pictures have attempted." In 2012, critic Manohla Dargis listed Touch of Evil as one of her ten favourite films of all time on 2012 Sight & Sound critics' poll list.

On the review aggregator website Rotten Tomatoes, the film received an approval rating of 95% based on 79 reviews, with an average rating of 8.80/10. The critical consensus reads, "Artistically innovative and emotionally gripping, Orson Welles' classic noir is a visual treat, as well as a dark, sinister thriller." On Metacritic, the film has a weighted average score of 99 out of 100, based on 22 critics, indicating "universal acclaim".

In 1998 Time Out conducted a poll and the film was voted 57th greatest film of all time. In 2000, the film was ranked at No. 55 in The Village Voices 100 Greatest Films list. Touch of Evil was placed No. 64 on American Film Institute's "100 Years, 100 Thrills" list in 2001.

In the Sight & Sound Greatest Films of All Time 2012 poll, the film was placed No. 26 and No. 57 by the directors and the critics respectively. In 2015, the film ranked 51st on BBC's "100 Greatest American Films" list, voted on by film critics from around the world.

Restorations

1976 release 
During the early 1970s, Robert Epstein, a UCLA film studies professor, had requested a film print for a screening in his class. Inside the Universal archives, he discovered a 108-minute print of Touch of Evil. On December 15, 1973, it was publicly screened at the Los Angeles County Museum of Art as part of "The 50 Great American Films". In June 1975, the American Film Institute, recognizing the historical value of the discovery, had submitted a duplicated negative to the Library of Congress for preservation. A 16 mm re-release provided through United World Films, Universal Pictures' non-theatrical distribution arm, was also discussed. Subsequently, it was screened at the Paris Film Festival, which was followed with a wide theatrical re-release by Universal Pictures that recognized an increased interest among film fans in Welles's works.

In 1975, Jonathan Rosenbaum published an article in the film magazine Sight & Sound, claiming that, except for a few minor details, the version was "apparently identical to Welles' final cut," and described it as the "definitive version". Joseph McBride, in a letter to Sight & Sound, issued a correction, identifying the cut as the "preview" version.

1998 release 
In 1998, Walter Murch, working from all available material, re-edited the film based on the Welles memo, with Rick Schmidlin who produced the re-edit and with the help of Bob O'Neil, Universal's director of film restoration and Bill Varney, Universal's Vice President of Sound Operations, participating in the restoration. As Welles's rough cut no longer exists, no true "director's cut" is possible but Murch was able to assemble a version incorporating most of the existing material, omitting some of the Keller scenes (though some were retained, either because they had replaced Welles's lost scenes and were necessary to the plot or because Welles had approved of their inclusion). Some of Welles's complaints concerned subtle sound and editing choices and Murch re-edited the material accordingly. Notable changes include the removal of the credits and Henry Mancini's music from the opening sequence, cross-cutting between the main story and Janet Leigh's subplot and the removal of Harry Keller's hotel lobby scene. Rick Schmidlin produced the 1998 edit, which had a limited but successful theatrical release (again by Universal) and was subsequently made available on DVD. The DVD includes an on-screen reproduction of the 58-page memo.

Originally scheduled to be premiered at the 1998 Cannes Film Festival with Janet Leigh, Walter Murch and Rick Schmidlin attending, the screening was canceled at the eleventh hour after threats of litigation from Welles's daughter, Beatrice Welles. Her suit against Universal, for not consulting her or obtaining her consent prior to the reworking of Touch of Evil, was settled out of court. Welles later said she had only asked Universal to inform her on what was being done and when she was ignored she told the Cannes Festival that the restoration was not sanctioned by the Welles Estate,

I saw it later and it was wonderful...I thought they did an amazing job and it was very well done. It was what he wanted and it made much more sense than that chopped up nightmare there was before. It was fine and it was his. If they had told me that from the very beginning, none of that would have happened.

The 1998 re-edit received awards from the New York Film Critics Circle, the Los Angeles Film Critics Association and National Society of Film Critics.

Home media 
The film was released on Blu-ray in 2011 in the UK by Eureka Entertainment (under licence from Universal) as part of their Masters of Cinema series. This release collected all three available versions; the theatrical and reconstruction versions include an alternative 1.37:1 ratio opposed to the original 1.85:1 aspect ratio (which is also included for both versions). In the US, all three versions (in only their 1.85:1 aspect ratio) were released on Blu-ray by Universal in 2014, with a remastered transfer and with a limited edition version including a booklet of the original 58-page memo. A more commercially available version was released a year later in 2015. In 2022, Kino Lorber released a 4K UHD version of the film.

See also 
 List of American films of 1958

References 
Citations

Bibliography

External links 

 
 
 
 
 
 
 
 
 
 Text of Welles's 58-page memo to Universal Studios
 Touch of Genius, Charlton Heston's account of the production of Touch of Evil.
 Literature on Touch of Evil

1950s crime films
1950s mystery films
1950s psychological thriller films
1958 films
American black-and-white films
American crime thriller films
American mystery films
1950s English-language films
Film noir
Films about kidnapping
Films about murderers
Films about police misconduct
Films based on American novels
Films directed by Orson Welles
Films scored by Henry Mancini
Films set in Mexico
Films set in the United States
Films set in Tijuana
Films shot in California
Films with screenplays by Orson Welles
United States National Film Registry films
Universal Pictures films
Films about honeymoon
1950s American films